There is no such page as “Lami”.

Lami may refer to:

People
 Lami (name), list of people with the name.

Places
 Lami, Fiji, town
 Lami (Open Constituency, Fiji)
 Lami José Lutzenberger Biological Reserve
 Lami, Porto Alegre, Brazil

Other
 Lami F.C., Fijian football team
 Lami language, Southern Loloish language of Yunnan, China
 Lami Mosque in Ulcinj, Montenegro
 Lami's theorem, physical equation relating the magnitudes of three coplanar, concurrent and non-collinear vectors
 Izulu Lami, 2009 South African film
 Phakade Lami, 2012 song by South African singer Nomfundo Moh

See also
 Lamy (disambiguation)